Monome is an Upstate New York-based company, founded by Brian Crabtree and Kelli Cain, that produces sound modules and MIDI controllers. Monome is also the name of their initial product, a grid-based controller that is now sometimes simply referred to as grid.

Design 

The Monome has a minimalist design, and has been complimented for its interface design. It is a box with a grid of back-lit buttons, with no labels or icons. No screws are visible on any surface of the Monome. The box that holds the Monome is made entirely of wood, usually walnut, with a clear aluminum top plate. There are three different size options for the Monome: sixteen by sixteen, sixteen by eight, and eight by eight.

Functionality 

Monome devices do not produce any sound on their own; they must be connected to a computer via USB, in which an app affords use to the device. The creators of Monome said: "The wonderful thing about this device is that is doesn't do anything really... It wasn't intended for any specific application. We'll make several applications, and others will make more. We hope to share as many of these as possible." A core design principle of the Monome is that it is not intended for any one specific application — the function of each button and the decision as to which lights are lit are completely up to the software communicating with the device over the Open Sound Control protocol. The Monome is not strictly a musical device. Depending on the software used, the Monome can function as anything from a sample cutter to a math machine.

Models 

Since 2006, several models have been produced, with typical sizes ranging from 64 to 256 buttons — plus a very limited run of 512-button devices.

In 2011, the first non-grid controller in the Monome family was introduced, the Monome Arc. The Monome Arc consists of two aluminum knobs mounted on a rectangular walnut box. Each knob is surrounded by a ring of 64 LED lights, and similarly to the Monome, affords function only by USB connection to an application. Some critics of the Arc have said it should be positioned as a complement to the Monome rather than a "complete control paradigm" that can stand alone, and that its overly-simplistic design can be seen as a limiting factor for independent use.

In September 2013, Monome introduced another open-sourced music device, the music computer called Aleph. Aleph was designed and engineered by original Monome creator Brian Crabtree and Ezra Buchla, musician and son of Don Buchla. The Aleph differs greatly from the minimalist Monome and Arc machines.  Aleph contains four digital inputs and outputs, four control voltage inputs and outputs, multiple optical encoders, a display screen and USB - all of which can be completely reprogrammed at the software level. Full release and distribution was planned for late Fall 2013.

Applications 

Several applications provide sample sequencing capabilities.  One such application is MLR, an application that allows for live sequencing and re-cutting of samples.  There are also many applications that allow for synthesis either via their own internal synthesizers or by sending MIDI/OSC messages to external synthesizers.

Impact 

Despite being produced irregularly in small quantities since its introduction in 2006, the Monome button-grid controller has had a significant impact on electronic music. Together with the physically similar Yamaha Tenori-On, which was released a year later in 2007, the Monome inspired interest in minimalist, grid-based music controllers throughout the industry.  That interest spawned hobbyist projects like the Arduinome and commercial products like the Akai APC40, the Novation Launchpad, and the Livid Instruments Block and Ohm64. GridFest, a festival for Monome enthusiasts, took place in New Mexico in May 2011, following the release of the Monome Arc earlier that year.

Notable Users 

 deadmau5
 James Holden
 Four Tet
 Pretty Lights
 Flying Lotus
 Nine Inch Nails contributor Alessandro Cortini
 Imogen Heap (on the Late Show with David Letterman) 
Chuck Blazevic of You'll Never Get to Heaven
Chris Randall of Sister Machine Gun and Micronaut 
Daedelus (musician)
Marko Ciciliani
King Unique
NO SIR E

See also 
 Controllerism
 Music technology
 List of open source hardware projects
 List of music software

References

External links 
 monome.org (Manufacturer's website)
 monome 64 implementation for iPad with MIRA & Max6
 Monome 64 review in Sound on Sound magazine, September 2008.
 monome 40h review in TapeOp magazine #62, Nov/Dec 2007.
 http://www.lividinstruments.com/index.php (OhmRGB and Ohm64 producer)

Electronic musical instruments
Experimental musical instruments
Computer peripherals
Open hardware electronic devices
User interfaces
Open hardware organizations and companies